Neil James Worden (born August 1, 1931) is a former American football fullback who played in the National Football League. Selected by the Philadelphia Eagles in the 1954 NFL Draft, he played in the 1954 and 1957 seasons. He also played five games for the Saskatchewan Roughriders of the CFL in 1959.  He played college football at the University of Notre Dame.

College years
Worden played fullback for Notre Dame from 1950 to 1953 under head coach Frank Leahy. His senior year, the 1953 Notre Dame team finished the season 9-0-1 and was runner-up to the national championship. Worden finished his Notre Dame rushing career with 476 attempts for 2039 yards and 29 touchdowns.

References

1931 births
Living people
Players of American football from Milwaukee
American football fullbacks
Notre Dame Fighting Irish football players
Philadelphia Eagles players